The 1856 United States presidential election in Maryland took place on November 4, 1856, as part of the 1856 United States presidential election. Voters chose eight representatives, or electors to the Electoral College, who voted for president and vice president.

Maryland voted for the Know Nothing candidate, former president Millard Fillmore, over the Democratic candidate, James Buchanan, and Republican candidate, John C. Frémont.

Fillmore won the state by a margin of 9.59%. Maryland was the only state to vote for Fillmore this election. This was the last time until 1948 that a Democrat won the presidency without carrying Maryland.

This was the first Presidential election that Howard County was able to vote in.

Results

Results by county

See also
 United States presidential elections in Maryland
 1856 United States presidential election
 1856 United States elections

Notes

References 

Maryland
1856
Presidential